Red Youth may refer to:
 Red Youth (Norway)
 Red Youth (Netherlands)
 Red Youth (Marxist–Leninist)